The Los Angeles School Police Department (LASPD) is a law enforcement agency in Los Angeles, California, whose duties are to provide police services to the Los Angeles Unified School District (thus, sometimes called L.A. Unified Police), also enforcing state and city laws. LASPD officers assist staff with disturbances and potential criminal activity on the campuses and in the surrounding communities on a daily basis.

Organization

The Los Angeles School Police Department was established in August 1948 to provide police services to the Los Angeles Unified School District. The department deploys six police divisions (Northwest, Northeast, West, Central, East, and South) with assignments consisted of Canine (K-9), Youth Services Divisions (Police Explorers, PALs Program), Safe Passages, Honor Guard, C.R.T. (Critical Response Team), Communications, Recruitment, Training Unit, Fleet Management, Payroll Section, Budget Services Unit, Records Unit, and Crime Analysis Unit.

Responsibility
24 hours a day, the LASPD is responsible for providing police services to:

 A jurisdiction covering 
 Approximately 618,000 students
 Approximately 72,000 teachers, administrators and additional school staff
 Approximately 1,300 schools, centers, and administrative offices

Ranks
The LASPD deploys sworn personnel in a variety of ranks:

Assignments

Assignments within the Police Department include:

 Campus Police Officer
 Patrol Officer
 Field Training Officer
 Criminal Investigation
 Canine
 Special Investigation
 Background Investigation
 Training and Support Services
 Traffic Enforcement
 Technology
 Police Explorers
 Special Response Team (S.R.T.)
 Supervising School Safety Officer (non-sworn position)
 School Safety Officer (non-sworn position)
 Police Dispatcher (civilian position)
 Specialist Reserve Officer (civilian position)
 Records, payroll, subpoena and other clerical support staff (civilian position)

All police officers must complete an intensive probationary period after graduation from the police academy. Prior to selection to any specialized unit, there may also be an additional 3-5 year field assignment prerequisite.

Controversy
The Los Angeles School Police Department has accepted crowd- and disturbance-control weapons including one armored vehicle and firearms from the federal government. Superintendent Ramon Cortines of LA Unified School District confirmed in June 2015 that the district's police force has ended its involvement in a federal program that delivered military-grade weapons to school districts. The decision on the so-called 1033 Program came on the heels of President Obama‘s announcement in May that he was severely restricting the parameters of the program.

On June 23, 2020, following student activism inspired by the Black Lives Matter movement, the LA Unified School District school board considered three resolutions to begin de-funding of the department. Also at issue was the departments use of pepper spray, which had been used 11 times in the 2018-2019 school year.

See also

 List of law enforcement agencies in California

References

External links
Los Angeles School Police Department Official Site
Los Angeles School Police Department Police Cars
   Los Angeles School Police Department Police Cars
Los Angeles School Police Association
Los Angeles School Police Department K-9 Unit

School police departments of California
Los Angeles Unified School District
Government agencies established in 1948